Brian Gleeson (born 3 November 1934) is a former Australian rules footballer in the VFL.

Gleeson attended St Patrick's College, Ballarat and later played with St Kilda at Centre half-forward initially. He developed into a skilful and agile ruckman, winning the Brownlow medal in 1957. In the Melbourne evening paper The Herald, 29 August 1957 Gleeson said:
"We are just like a family at St Kilda," he said. "We depend on teamwork and we bring each other into the game. Coach Alan Killigrew is responsible for that and the officials and supporters have given us encouragement and confidence."

Appointed club captain in 1958, he injured a knee in a practice match and never played VFL football again.

Gleeson and 1961 Brownlow Medal winner John James, (who also finished third to Gleeson in 1957),  played in the same school team.

References 
St Kilda Hall of Fame Profile
School reference.
Herald quote
Saints honor roll

External links

St Kilda Players Encyclopedia

Brownlow Medal winners
Trevor Barker Award winners
1934 births
Living people
St Kilda Football Club players
Australian rules footballers from New South Wales
People educated at St Patrick's College, Ballarat